Ohio is an unincorporated community in northern St. Clair County, in the U.S. state of Missouri. The community is at the intersection of Missouri routes A and F and south of Cooper Creek. Lowry City is on Missouri Route 13 approximately seven miles to the east and Appleton City is approximately nine miles to the west-northwest on Missouri Route 52.

History
A post office called Ohio was established in 1878, and remained in operation until 1941. The community took its name from Ohio, the native state of a large share of the first settlers.

References

Unincorporated communities in St. Clair County, Missouri
Unincorporated communities in Missouri